Bilaspur district is a district of the Chhattisgarh state of India. Bilaspur city is the headquarters of the district. , it is the second most populous district of Chhattisgarh (out of 27), after Raipur.

Etymology 
The name of the district derived from the city of Bilaspur, the administrative headquarter of the district. The name "Bilaspur" originated from Bilasa Devi, a fisherwoman who founded this city, according to a legend.

Geography 

Bilaspur district is situated between 21º47' and 23º8' north latitudes and 81º14' and 83º15' east longitudes. The district is bounded by Gaurela-Pendra-Marwahi district on the north, Anuppur District and Dindori District of Madhya Pradesh state on the west, Kabirdham on the southwest, Durg and Raipur on the south and Korba and Janjgir-Champa on the east. The area of the district is 6377 km². Bilaspur is officially the judicial and cultural capital of Chhattisgarh and also boosts various cultural and social events. The district is also an important educational and medical hub of Chhattisgarh due to several world class hospitals for example: Apollo Hospital. Education at the primary and higher level has been considerably improving in the past decade due to the opening of several international standard schools ranging from D.A.V. Public School, Delhi Public School, San Francis H/S School, St. Xavier's H/S School, Maharishi Vidya Mandir and The Jain International School. The city has been also witnessing high rate of infrastructural growth for past few years due to the several initiatives taken by the state government to improve the basic infrastructure of the city. Today, the city has two developed shopping malls (Rama Magneto Mall and 36 
City Mall) which attract a large number of crowd especially the youth from all over the state.

History 
Bilaspur was established by the Bilas Deo, Maharaja of Bandhavgarh. The area which comprises present-day Bilaspur District was under the control of the Bhonsla Rajas of Nagpur until 1818 and was governed by a Maratha Subah (district officer). In 1818, the British started administering the area on behalf of the Raghuji III, who was minor. The area was administered by a commissioner. In 1853, after the death of Raghuji III, British annexed the Nagpur Kingdom to British India as Nagpur Province, and in 1861 when the new Central Provinces was born, Bilaspur was organized into a separate district. In October 1903, a new province ‘The Central Provinces and Berar’ was constituted and Bilaspur District became a part of the Chhattisgarh Division of the province. In October 1905, on transfer of Sambalpur District to Bengal Province, Chandrapur-Padampur and Malkhurda estates were transferred to Bilaspur District. In 1906, when the Drug district (presently Durg District) was formed, a part of the Mungeli Tahsil was transferred to the new district. Also, another part of the district was transferred to the Raipur District. On 25 May 1998, the original Bilaspur District was split into 3 smaller districts, present Bilaspur, Korba and Janjgir-Champa.

In 2012, seeing the bad condition of the development of roads and other amenities, youth of the city joined together on social networking sites to form a group named 'Concern 4 Bilaspur' to try to take every citizen's attention towards the scenario and finding solutions to solve them.

Administration 

Bilaspur Division consists of six districts.

 Bilaspur
 Korba
 Raigarh
 Janjgir-Champa
 Mungeli
 Gaurela-Pendra-Marwahi

Bilaspur district consists of 5 tehsils.

These tehsils are

These tehsils are Bilaspur, Kota, Takhatpur, Bilha and Masturi. The total number of villages in the district is 708. 

The headquarters of the district is Bilaspur. It is the second largest city in the state and the seat of the High Court of Chhattisgarh. It is called the Nyaydhani (judicial capital) of Chhattisgarh. Bilaspur has the famous Kanan Pendari Zoo Park. Arpa is a river passing through the district, it very shallow in depth but does creates havoc during rains.

Economy 
Bilaspur is the headquarters of South Eastern Coalfields, the largest and most profitable subsidiary of Coal India. The district of Bilaspur also has the largest number of cement factories in the state consisting of manufacturers such as Lafarge, Century, ACC etc. The Bilaspur railway zone has been fifth time in a row awarded as the most profitable railway zone by the ministry of Indian railways this year. The district is also well connected to the rest of the country by means of rail and road network hence improving the economy of the city. The city's main commercial hub is Vyapar Vihar, Telipara, Link Road, Sepath Road, Bus Stand Road, Rajiv Plaza and Goal Bazar. Bilaspur is also the Regional Headquarters of Chhattisgarh State Electricity Board, headed by Chief Engineer (BR). The Chief Engineer (BR) has the jurisdiction of Bilaspur, Korba, Janjgir-Champa and Raigarh Districts for supply of electricity to all LT and HT consumers. After Regional Headquarters of Raipur of CSEB, the Bilaspur is the second largest jurisdiction for supply of electricity in Chhattisgarh State.

Business travel and hotels 
As an industrial city, Bilaspur also receives a large number of business travelers from within India and other countries, which requires the city to have good hotels. There are many hotels in Bilaspur, however the very first notable hotel and the only international brand hotel 'Courtyard by Marriott' opened in April 2014. The hotel is located near Mangla Chowk and is next to Citymall 36, a prominent shopping destination in the city. All Bilaspur's other hotels are locally run standalone units and although they do not offer high quality, they are relatively inexpensive.

Transport 
By AIR

Nearest Airport is Bilasa devi kevat Airport. 13 Km from Nehru Chok.

By Railway

Bilaspur has the zonal office of South East Central Railway, the 16th zone of Indian Railway which is recognized to have the maximum loading. The city is very well connected to rest of the country through good road and rail network. The city falls in the Mumbai Kolkata rail network. The Bilaspur railway station is the most important railway station in the state from where several trains for different parts of the country originate.

By Road

Bilaspur is second largest city of Chhattisgarh and connected through bus service to other major district of Chhattisgarh Bilaspur is also connected through bus service to other states like UP, Jharkhand, Bihar, MP, Odisha. The District Administration and Municipal Corporation of Bilaspur City are forming a joint venture, to operate world class City Bus services in Bilaspur City by the end of 2007. However autorickshaw rules the road.

Demographics 

According to the 2011 census, Bilaspur district, Chhattisgarh has a population of 2,663,629, roughly equal to the nation of Kuwait or the US state of Nevada. This ranks it 152nd in India (out of a total of 640). Its population growth rate over the decade 2001-2011 was 33.21%. Bilaspur has a sex ratio of 972 females for every 1000 males, and a literacy rate of 71.59%.

The divided district has a population of 1,625,502, of which 582,146 (35.81%) live in urban areas. The divided district has a sex ratio of 964 females per 1000 males. Scheduled Castes and Scheduled Tribes make up 20.76% and 14.43% of the population respectively.

Languages 

At the time of the 2011 Census of India, 79.46% of the population in the district spoke Chhattisgarhi, 15.03% Hindi and 1.06% Sindhi as their first language.

Tourism 
This district has Achanakmar Wildlife Sanctuary.

References

External links 
 
 Bilaspur district gazetteer Hindi बिलासपुर-वैभव 

 
Districts of Chhattisgarh
Coal mining districts in India
1861 establishments in British India